Lake Junin (Spanish Lago Junín, named after the nearby town of Junin) or Chinchaycocha (possibly from Quechua chincha, chinchay north, northern, chinchay ocelot, qucha lake, lagoon, "northern lake" or "ocelot lake") is the largest lake entirely within Peruvian territory. Even though Lake Titicaca has a much larger area, its eastern half is located on Bolivian territory. Lake Junin is an important birdwatching destination in the country.

Geography

Most of the lake is located in the Junin Province of the Junin Region, its northwestern tip belongs to the Pasco Province which is in the Pasco Region.

The lake is on the upper reaches of the Mantaro River within the Amazon River catchment. There is a hydroelectric power station which regulates the water level of the lake at the outflow of the lake, through the Upamayo Dam. In years of abundant rains, fluctuations in the water level are moderate, but in years of drought water level may drop  leaving extensive areas exposed.

The headwaters of streams flowing into Lake Junin have been named as the "most distant" source of the Amazon River, one of the three places proposed as the "true" source of the Amazon.

Pollution
Since 1933 there has been an inflow of mining residues into the lake, which has adversely affected the fish and bird fauna in parts of the lake. Sewage coming from the cities of Junín and Carhuamayo also pollutes the lake. These types of pollution are contributing to the natural eutrophication process of this wetland.

Fauna and flora
Lake Junin has two endemic birds: the critically endangered Junín flightless grebe (Podiceps taczanowskii) and the endangered Junín rail (Laterallus tuerosi). The two endangered species of frogs in the genus Batrachophrynus are restricted to the vicinity of the lake, although only one of these, the entirely aquatic Lake Junín giant frog (B. macrostomus), is found in the lake itself. Three Orestias pupfish, O. empyraeus, O. gymnota and O. polonorum, and the catfish Trichomycterus oroyae are endemic to the lake basin and its vicinity (including associated streams, rivers and smaller lakes).

The fish fauna is abundant but consists of few species, including introduced species. The introduced trout have been implicated in the decline of the endemic frogs.

See also 

 Antaqucha
 Allqaqucha

References

External links
 Factsheet of the natural reserve

Lakes of Peru
Lake Junin
Lakes of Junín Region
Lakes of Pasco Region